The Women's U22 South American Volleyball Championship is a sport competition for national women's volleyball teams with players under 23 years, currently held biannually and organized by the Confederación Sudamericana de Voleibol (CSV), the South America volleyball federation. The first championship was held in Popayán, Colombia, in 2014.

Results summary

Medals summary

MVP by edition
2014 – 
2016 –

See also

 Men's U23 South American Volleyball Championship
 Women's Junior South American Volleyball Championship
 Girls' Youth South American Volleyball Championship
 Girls' U16 South American Volleyball Championship

References
CSV

U23
U23
Recurring sporting events established in 2014
International volleyball competitions
International women's volleyball competitions
Youth volleyball
Biennial sporting events